Stride  may refer to:
Darren Stride, (born 1976), world traveller, self-employed business man
Darren Stride, (born 1975), English professional footballer
David Stride, (born 1958), former English professional footballer
Elizabeth Stride, (1843–1888), murder victim
John Stride, (1936–2018), English actor
Mel Stride, British politician
Steve Stride, (born c.1950),  former operations director of Aston Villa FC
Virginia Stride, British actress